Coleophora binderella is a moth of the family Coleophoridae. It is found from Scandinavia and Finland to the Iberian Peninsula and Italy, and from Ireland to the Baltic States and Romania.

 
Head deep shining ochreous. Antennae white, indistinctly ringed with fuscous, basal joint ochreous. Forewings deep shining ochreous, coppery tinged. Hindwings blackish..  

Adults are on wing from late June to July.

The larvae feed on Alnus glutinosa, Alnus incana, Alnus viridis, Betula pubescens, Betula pendula, Carpinus betulus and Corylus avellana. They live in a composite leaf case composed of large leaf fragments. In spring, the case has two colours, consisting of dull yellowish and grey or pink old material dating from before hibernation and reddish brown new material.

References

External links
 

binderella
Moths described in 1832
Moths of Europe
Taxa named by Vincenz Kollar